The Air Craft Marine Engineering Company (ACME) was a short-lived aircraft manufacturer based in Van Nuys, California. It was established in 1954 to develop an amphibious utility aircraft, the ACME Anser.

References

Defunct aircraft manufacturers of the United States
Manufacturing companies based in Los Angeles
Defunct manufacturing companies based in California
Van Nuys, Los Angeles